The Chadic languages form a branch of the Afroasiatic language family. They are spoken in parts of the Sahel. They include 150 languages spoken across northern Nigeria, southern Niger, southern Chad, the Central African Republic, and northern Cameroon. The most widely spoken Chadic language is Hausa, a lingua franca of much of inland Eastern West Africa.

Composition
Paul Newman (1977) classified the languages into the four groups which have been accepted in all subsequent literature. Further subbranching, however, has not been as robust; Roger Blench(2006), for example, only accepts the A/B bifurcation of East Chadic. Kujargé has been added from Blench (2008), who suggests Kujargé may have split off before the breakup of Proto-Chadic and then subsequently became influenced by East Chadic. Subsequent work by Joseph Lovestrand argues strongly that Kujarge is a valid member of East Chadic. The placing of Luri as a primary split of West Chadic is erroneous. Bernard Caron (2004) shows that this language is South Bauchi and part of the Polci cluster.

West Chadic. Two branches, which include
(A) the Hausa, Ron, Bole, and Angas languages; and
(B) the Bade, Warji, and Zaar languages.
Biu–Mandara (Central Chadic). Three branches, which include
(A) the Bura, Kamwe, and Bata languages, among other groups;
(B) the Buduma and Musgu languages; and
(C) Gidar
East Chadic. Two branches, which include
(A) the Tumak, Nancere, and Kera languages; and
(B) the Dangaléat, Mukulu, and Sokoro languages
Masa
? Kujargé

Origin

Modern genetic studies of Northwestern Cameroonian Chadic-speaking populations have observed high frequencies of the Y-Chromosome Haplogroup R1b in these populations (the R1b-V88 variant). This paternal marker is common in parts of West Eurasia, but otherwise rare in Africa. Cruciani et al. (2010) thus proposed that the Proto-Chadic speakers during the mid-Holocene (~7,000 years ago) migrated from the Levant to the Central Sahara, and from there settled in the Lake Chad Basin. 

However, a more recent study in 2018 found that haplogroup R1b-V88 entered Chad much more recently during "Baggarization" (the migration of Baggara Arabs to the Sahel in the 17th century AD), finding no evidence of ancient Eurasian gene flow. 

Another study in 2018 had R1b-V88 arriving and spreading in the area of Lake Chad approximately 3720-3230 BCE. This is due to the Starlike nature of the spread of specific R1b-V88 subclades notably R-V1589 suggesting an origin point for the spread near Lake Chad.

Loanwords
Chadic languages contain many Nilo-Saharan loanwords from either the Songhay or Maban branches, pointing to early contact between Chadic and Nilo-Saharan speakers as Chadic was migrating west.

Although Adamawa languages are spoken adjacently to Chadic languages, interaction between Chadic and Adamawa is limited.

Pronouns
Pronouns in Proto-Chadic, as compared to pronouns in Proto-Afroasiatic (Vossen & Dimmendaal 2020:351):

Comparative vocabulary
Sample basic vocabulary in different Chadic branches listed in order from west to east, with reconstructions of other Afroasiatic branches also given for comparison:

Bibliography
 Caron, Bernard 2004. Le Luri: quelques notes sur une langue tchadique du Nigeria. In: Pascal Boyeldieu & Pierre Nougayrol (eds.), Langues et Cultures: Terrains d’Afrique. Hommages à France Cloarec-Heiss (Afrique et Langage 7). 193–201. Louvain-Paris: Peeters.
 Lukas, Johannes (1936) 'The linguistic situation in the Lake Chad area in Central Africa.' Africa, 9, 332–349.
 Lukas, Johannes. Zentralsudanische Studien, Hamburg 1937;
 Newman, Paul and Ma, Roxana (1966) 'Comparative Chadic: phonology and lexicon.' Journal of African Languages, 5, 218–251.
 Newman, Paul (1977) 'Chadic classification and reconstructions.' Afroasiatic Linguistics 5, 1, 1–42.
 Newman, Paul (1978) 'Chado-Hamitic 'adieu': new thoughts on Chadic language classification', in Fronzaroli, Pelio (ed.), Atti del Secondo Congresso Internazionale di Linguistica Camito-Semitica. Florence: Instituto de Linguistica e di Lingue Orientali, Università di Firenze, 389–397.
 Newman, Paul (1980) The Classification of Chadic within Afroasiatic. Leiden: Universitaire Pers Leiden.
 Herrmann Jungraithmayr, Kiyoshi Shimizu: Chadic lexical roots. Reimer, Berlin 1981.
 Herrmann Jungraithmayr, Dymitr Ibriszimow: Chadic lexical roots. 2 volumes. Reimer, Berlin 1994
 Schuh, Russell (2003) 'Chadic overview', in M. Lionel Bender, Gabor Takacs, and David L. Appleyard (eds.), Selected Comparative-Historical Afrasian Linguistic Studies in Memory of Igor M. Diakonoff, LINCOM Europa, 55–60.

Data sets
 Robert Forkel, & Tiago Tresoldi. (2019). lexibank/kraftchadic: Chadic Wordlists (Version v3.0) [Data set]. Zenodo.

See also
Proto-Chadic reconstructions (Wiktionary)

References

 
Afroasiatic languages